Zacco may refer to:

 Zacco (fish), a genus of cyprinid fishes
 Zacco (dynasty), a Sicilian aristocratic family
 Ateliers de Construction Aéronautique de Zeebrugge, a Belgian aircraft manufacturer